FLC may refer to:

 Federal Laboratory Consortium, a U.S.-based technology transfer organization
 Ferroelectric liquid crystal
 Fisheries Law Centre, in Vancouver, British Columbia, Canada
 FLIC (file format), used to store animation files
 Florida Literacy Coalition, Inc., an American non-profit organization
 Flowering Locus C, a plant gene
 Folsom Lake College, in California, United States
 Football League Championship, in England
 Football League Cup, in England
 Forest Lake Camp, in New York, United States
 Forming limit curve
 Fort Lewis College, in Durango, Colorado, United States
 Free light chains of antibodies
 Front de Liberation du Champa in Southeast Asia
 Full load current
 Fun Lovin' Criminals, an American band

See also 
 floruit circa (fl. c.)